Sir John Palgrave, 1st Baronet (1605–1672) was an English politician who sat in the House of Commons from 1647 to 1648.

Palgrave was of Northwood Barningham, Norfolk and of the Inner Temple, and was a Gentleman of the Privy Chamber. He was created a baronet by Charles I on 24 June 1641.

In 1647, Palgrave was elected Member of Parliament for Norfolk in the Long Parliament.  In December 1648, he was excluded from parliament under Pride's Purge. 
 
Palgrave died at the age of 66.

Palgrave married firstly Elizabeth Jermy, daughter of John Jermy  of Gunton, Norfolk.  He married secondly, Anne Gascoigne, widow of Cotton Gascoigne and  daughter of Sir William de Grey, of Martin, Norfolk, and Islington Middlesex. He was succeeded in the baronetcy by his son Augustine.

References

1605 births
1672 deaths
English MPs 1640–1648
People from North Norfolk (district)
Members of the Inner Temple
Gentlemen of the Privy Chamber
Baronets in the Baronetage of England
Members of the Parliament of England for Norfolk